The Penniless Millionaire is a 1921 British silent drama film directed by Einar Bruun and starring Stewart Rome, Fabienne Fabrèges and Gregory Scott.

Cast
 Stewart Rome as Bernard Jarrold 
 Fabienne Fabrèges as Angela Jarrold 
 Gregory Scott as Belthorp 
 Cameron Carr as Tim Dolan 
 George Foley as Martin Stornaway

References

Bibliography
 Low, Rachael. History of the British Film, 1918-1929. George Allen & Unwin, 1971.

External links

1921 films
1921 drama films
British silent feature films
British drama films
Films based on British novels
Films directed by Einar Bruun
British black-and-white films
1920s English-language films
1920s British films
Silent drama films